Asia Muhammad and Yasmin Schnack were the defending champions, having won the event in 2012. Schnack decided not to participate while Muhammad played alongside Allie Will. They lost, however, in the semifinals.

Eleni Daniilidou and Coco Vandeweghe won the tournament, defeating Melanie Oudin and Taylor Townsend in the final, 6–4, 7–6(7–2).

Seeds

Draw

References 
 Draw

Coleman Vision Tennis Championships - Doubles
Coleman Vision Tennis Championships
2013 Coleman Vision Tennis Championships